Lexy may refer to:
 Lexy, Meurthe-et-Moselle, a commune of the Meurthe-et-Moselle department in France
 Edward Lexy (1897-1970), British film actor
 Lexy Ortega (born 1969), Italian chess Grandmaster
 Lexy (singer), Korean female soloist
 Lexy, one half of Lexy & K-Paul, DJs from Berlin

See also
 Lexi, a given name (typically for a girl)